Satkhira() is a city and district headquarter of Satkhira District in Khulna Division, south-west Bangladesh.The city has a population of about 2,50,000, making it the 20th largest city in Bangladesh. Satkhira also has a large proportion of the Sundarbans rainforest of Bangladesh.

References

https://www.prothomalo.com/bangladesh/district/%E0%A6%B8%E0%A6%BE%E0%A6%A4%E0%A6%95%E0%A7%8D%E0%A6%B7%E0%A7%80%E0%A6%B0%E0%A6%BE-%E0%A6%B6%E0%A6%B9%E0%A6%B0-%E0%A6%AF%E0%A6%BE%E0%A6%A8%E0%A6%9C%E0%A6%9F%E0%A7%87-%E0%A6%A7%E0%A7%81%E0%A6%81%E0%A6%95%E0%A6%9B%E0%A7%87-%E0%A6%B2%E0%A6%BE%E0%A6%96-%E0%A6%AE%E0%A6%BE%E0%A6%A8%E0%A7%81%E0%A6%B7

Populated places in Khulna District